Phosphorus triiodide (PI3) is an inorganic compound with the formula PI3. A red solid, it is a common misconception that PI3 is too unstable to be stored; it is, in fact, commercially available.  It is widely used in organic chemistry for converting alcohols to alkyl iodides.  It is also a powerful reducing agent.  Note that phosphorus also forms a lower iodide, P2I4, but the existence of PI5 is doubtful at room temperature.

Properties
PI3 has a low dipole moment in carbon disulfide solution, because the P-I bond has almost no dipole.  The P-I bond is also weak; PI3 is much less stable than PBr3 and PCl3, with a standard enthalpy of formation for PI3 of only −46 kJ/ mol (solid). The phosphorus atom has an NMR chemical shift of 178 ppm (downfield of H3PO4).

Reactions
Phosphorus triiodide reacts vigorously with water, producing phosphorous acid (H3PO3) and hydroiodic acid (HI), along with smaller amounts of phosphine and various P-P-containing compounds.  Alcohols likewise form alkyl iodides, this providing the main use for PI3.

PI3 is also a powerful reducing agent and deoxygenating agent.  It reduces sulfoxides to sulfides, even at −78 °C.  Meanwhile, heating a 1-iodobutane solution of PI3 with red phosphorus causes reduction to P2I4.

Preparation
The usual method or preparation is by the union of the elements, often by addition of iodine to a solution of white phosphorus in carbon disulfide:
 P4  +6 I2  →  4PI3
Alternatively, PCl3 may be converted to PI3 by the action of hydrogen iodide or certain metal iodides.

Uses
Phosphorus triiodide is commonly used in the laboratory for the conversion of primary or secondary alcohols to alkyl iodides. The alcohol is frequently used as the solvent, on top of being the reactant. Often the PI3 is made in situ by the reaction of red phosphorus with iodine in the presence of the alcohol; for example, the conversion of methanol to give iodomethane:
PI3  +  3  →  3  + " "

These alkyl iodides are useful compounds for nucleophilic substitution reactions, and for the preparation of Grignard reagents.

See also
 Nitrogen triiodide
 Diphosphorus tetraiodide
 Phosphorus trifluoride
 Phosphorus trichloride
 Phosphorus tribromide
 Phosphorus pentaiodide

References

Phosphorus iodides
Phosphorus(III) compounds